Townhill is the name of a hill, a residential district and a community (civil parish) and electoral ward in Swansea, Wales, UK. It had a population of 8,696 in 2011.

History
The Garden City style layout of Townhill was overseen by Ernest Morgan, the Swansea city architect, in the early 1920s.

Townhill Baptist Church
Townhill Baptist Church was formed on the hill in the late 1920s and the church still meets today on Sunday mornings and evenings in the original building on Powys Avenue.

Swansea St Nicholas on the Hill and St Jude, Townhill
St Nicholas on the Hill, the parish church for Townhill and Mayhill, is located on the corner of Dyfed Avenue and Powys Avenue. With the closure of St Jude in Mount Pleasant in 2015, the two parishes were merged into The Benefice of Swansea St Nicholas on the Hill and St Jude.

Townhill district
The suburb of Townhill falls within the Townhill ward.  The district of Townhill consists of a council estate and some private housing spread over a steep hill of the same name bordering Mayhill and visible from the Swansea city centre.  The area overlooks Swansea city centre, Swansea Docks and Swansea Bay to the south; and Cockett, Gendros and Cwmbwrla to the north.

Local amenities at the top of the hill include a public library, the Townhill Community primary school, a nursery school and some playing fields.  Swansea Metropolitan University had a campus to the west. In 2018 the university opened a new £350 million campus at the SA1 Swansea Waterfront, housing Yr Athrofa: the Institute of Education, and the Faculty of Architecture, Computing and Engineering. Staff and students from the city centre Townhill and Mount Pleasant campuses relocated to SA1, with Townhill closing at the end of the 2017–18 academic year although the university has retained a presence at Mount Pleasant.

Townhill is a Communities First area.

Townhill landform
Backing Swansea city centre to the north is a large slab of sandstone called Townhill.  The summit of Townhill is approximately 175m above sea level.  At the top of hill lies the housing estate of Townhill which falls away to the north west of the hill.  The Mayhill district lies on the northeast face of the hill.  The southeastern face of the hill is the steepest and is covered by the district of Mount Pleasant.  The Uplands district occupies the southwestern face of the hill which slopes gently downwards towards Singleton Park.

Rosehill Quarry Community Park
The hill is rounded by a band of rock which is too steep to develop on and is recognised by the City and County of Swansea council as a wildlife corridor.  In this band, on the south side of the hill is the designated Rosehill Quarry Community Park.  Rosehill Quarry is a semi-natural urban green space which is not formally cultivated in its entirety.  Wildlife areas include a stream, waterfall and several ponds.  There are over one hundred species of plants including oak, royal fern and rowan trees.  Around thirty species of birds can be found in the park, including sparrowhawk, kestrel, and tawny owl.  Additionally, there are frogs, newts, dragonfiles and damselflies including the blue-tailed damselfly, which is used as the quarry's symbol. Recreational facilities in the park include picnic tables, play equipment, and a BMX bike track.

The Rosehill Quarry six-acre site was quarried for stone for house-building from the 1840s, creating the only flat ground in the area.  The area stood derelict for some time until the early 20th century when the area was used as a tennis court which later fell into disuse.  In the 1970s, planning permission was granted for a block of flats, which never got built.  In the 1970s and 1980s, local residents' initiatives persuaded the local council to buy the land and designate it as a public open space in the Local Plan.  The Rosehill Quarry Group was formed, with support from the council, to develop and maintain the quarry as the first community park in Swansea.

References

Rosehill Quarry
Townhill Baptist Church

Communities in Swansea
Districts of Swansea
Mountains and hills of Swansea